Ana Catarina Mendes (born 1973) is a Portuguese politician. As a member of the Portuguese Socialist Party (PS) she has been a deputy in the Portuguese Assembly of the Republic since 1995 and, from 2019, led the party in the National Assembly. In March 2022, she was appointed Minister of Parliamentary Affairs in the XXIII Constitutional Government.

Early life
Ana Catarina Veiga Santos Mendonça Mendes was born in Coimbra on 14 January 1973. She obtained an undergraduate law degree from the Faculty of Law of the University of Lisbon and a master's degree in New Frontiers of Law at the ISCTE – University Institute of Lisbon. Becoming a socialist at an early age, Mendes led the Almada and the Setúbal District Federation of Socialist Youth (Juventude Socialista), the youth wing of the Portuguese Socialist Party (PS). She married Paulo Pedroso but they are now divorced.

Political career
Mendes served as a councillor in the Almada municipality from 1993 to 1997 and was elected to the national Assembly of the Republic in 1995 as a representative of the PS for the Setúbal District, a position she continues to occupy. From 2015 to 2019 she served as Assistant Secretary-General of the PS. From 2019, she was the Socialist Party's first female Parliamentary Leader, in which role she stressed her intention to promote further diversity within the Parliamentary party. Following the 2022 Portuguese legislative election, Mendes was appointed as Minister of Parliamentary Affairs.

Broadcasting
Since early 2018 Mendes has been a regular political commentator on Portuguese television, beginning with Televisão Independente (TVI) and the radio station TSF, then moving to a weekly programme on the SIC Notícias television channel, before moving back to TVI.

References

1973 births
Living people
People from Coimbra
Socialist Party (Portugal) politicians
Members of the Assembly of the Republic (Portugal)
University of Lisbon alumni
Women government ministers of Portugal
20th-century Portuguese politicians
20th-century Portuguese women politicians
21st-century Portuguese politicians
21st-century Portuguese women politicians
Women members of the Assembly of the Republic (Portugal)